The Cambridge History of the First World War is a three-volume work, published in 2013 and 2014 by Cambridge University Press, that covers different aspects of the First World War.

References

2013 non-fiction books
2014 non-fiction books
Cambridge University Press books
History books about World War I